The Manzanares is a river in the centre of the Iberian Peninsula, which flows from the Sierra de Guadarrama, passes through Madrid, and eventually empties into the Jarama river, which in turn is a right-bank tributary to the Tagus.

In its urban section, the Manzanares River was modified to create a section of water several meters deep, in some parts navigable by canoes. This project of channeling and damming has been partially reversed in a re-naturalization project.

Course

Sources 

It is formally called Manzanares after the confluence of the arroyo de la Condesa and the Arroyo de Valdemartín.

The Arroyo de Valdemartín's watershed spans from the Alto de Valdemartín to the Cabeza de Hierro Menor (2,373 m).

Upper course 

The upper river basin is protected as the  Parque Regional de la Cuenca Alta del Manzanares, a nature reserve which is recognised as a biosphere reserve by UNESCO.

The Manzanares flows in a south-eastern direction from its sources, and passes through the medieval town of Manzanares el Real where it is dammed to form the Santillana reservoir, one of the most important water supplies for the capital.

The river then takes a southern direction and enters the Monte de El Pardo, an ecologically valuable area on the edge of Madrid.

Urban course 

The river was canalised where it passes through the built-up areas of the city.  In the 21st century the river was restored to provide biodiversity and facilities for Madrid residents.

The Manzanares skims past the westernmost part of the city and further downstream serves as a dividing line between the old centre of the city and the Carabanchel and Usera neighbourhoods to the southwest. It is along this stretch that it passes next to Atlético Madrid's former football ground, the Vicente Calderón. The river leaves the city at its southernmost tip.

Lower course 

It makes a strong eastern turn which takes it past the village of Perales del Río. It empties into the Jarama within the municipal limits of Rivas Vaciamadrid.

Historical importance

The river Manzanares, although small and relatively unimportant geographically, has had a great historical importance due to its close relation to the city of Madrid, which was founded by the Moors as a citadel overlooking the river  in the ninth century.

The river is also featured in many paintings of the late 18th to early 19th-century painter Francisco de Goya, which show traditionally dressed Madrileños in activities like dancing or having picnics next to the river.

The Manzanares was also an important defence line for the Republican forces during the Siege of Madrid in the Spanish Civil War, and many bunkers can still be seen near the village of Perales del Río.  The Bridge of the French was of crucial importance because of its strategic location. There, nationalist forces were repeatedly repelled and denied access to Madrid’s city centre.

See also 
 List of rivers of Spain
 Praga Bridge
 Puente de Segovia
 Arganzuela Footbridge
 Bridge of Toledo

References
Citations

Bibliography
 

Rivers of Spain
Geography of Madrid
Tributaries of the Jarama
Rivers of the Community of Madrid